Francis Burns may refer to:
Francis Burns (footballer) (born 1948), Scottish former footballer
Francis Burns (minister), American Methodist minister and missionary
Francis Putnam Burns (1807–?), piano maker in Albany, New York
Larry Gelbart (1928–2009), who used the pseudonym Francis Burns

See also
Frank Burns (disambiguation)

Francis Byrne (disambiguation)